Stylidium arenicola is a species of dicotyledon plant in the genus Stylidium (also known as trigger plants). It was described in 1969 by Sherwin Carlquist.

Distribution 
The species is endemic to Western Australia, where it is mostly found in Wiluna and in Kalgoorlie.

References 

arenicola